György Gordon (Budapest, 1924. June 13 – Wakefield, West Yorkshire, 2005. March 5) was a Hungarian painter and graphic artist.

References 

1924 births
2005 deaths